Sami Abu Shehadeh is an Israeli Arab politician. He is the leader of Balad, and served as a  member of the Knesset for the Joint List from 2019 to 2022.

Biography

Abu Shehadeh was born in Lod to a Muslim family and raised in Jaffa. He attended Terra Santa High School, a Catholic school located in Old Jaffa.

Abu Shehadeh studied for a master's degree in Middle Eastern history at Tel Aviv University, and wrote a doctorate on Jaffa as a cultural center during the British Mandate.

Political career
Abu Shehadeh was a member of the Tel Aviv-Yafo City Council for a number of years until 2013, on behalf of the Jaffa faction. He served as the Director of the Yaffa Youth Movement.

In the elections for the 22nd Knesset, he was placed third on the Balad list following the retirement of Mazen Ghnaim, and after uniting with the other Arab parties, he was placed 13th on the Joint List. On 23 January 2021, he was elected as the party chairman of the Balad party in its primaries.

Personal life
Abu Shehada lives in Jaffa.

References

External links

1975 births
Living people
Arab members of the Knesset
Joint List politicians
Members of the 22nd Knesset (2019–2020)
Members of the 23rd Knesset (2020–2021)
Members of the 24th Knesset (2021–2022)
People from Lod
Tel Aviv University alumni